Sylvester Hicks (born April 2, 1955) is a former American football defensive end who played four seasons with the Kansas City Chiefs of the National Football League. He was drafted by the Kansas City Chiefs in the second round of the 1978 NFL Draft. He played college football at Tennessee State University and attended North Side High School in Jackson, Tennessee.

References

External links
Just Sports Stats

Living people
1955 births
Players of American football from Tennessee
American football defensive ends
African-American players of American football
Tennessee State Tigers football players
Kansas City Chiefs players
People from Jackson, Tennessee
21st-century African-American people
20th-century African-American sportspeople